"Imbranato" is a song written by Italian pop singer Tiziano Ferro. It was released as the third single from his first album Rosso Relativo (2002) and achieved a huge success in Italy, Switzerland, Belgium, Austria, France, Spain and Mexico. In Spain and in Latin America was released Alucinado, the Spanish version of Imbranato who reached at #1 in the Mexican and Spanish singles chart.

Track listing 

 Imbranato (Italian version)
 Imbranato (French version)

Chart

Weekly charts

Year-end charts

References

2002 singles
Italian-language songs
Tiziano Ferro songs
Pop ballads
Songs written by Tiziano Ferro
2006 songs
EMI Records singles